The 1967–68 British Home Championship football was the final stage of the 1968 UEFA European Football Championship qualifying for the Home Nations, and provided revenge for an England team smarting from a defeat on their home ground to the Scots just months after winning the 1966 FIFA World Cup which cost them the 1966–67 British Home Championship. The English victories against Wales and Ireland in the first two games meant that going into the final match they only required a draw, which they eventually achieved in a hard-fought match, winning the tournament and the place in the European Championship. The Scots started badly against the unfancied Irish, losing in Belfast, and never recovered, scraping a win against Wales and needing a win against a dominant England team. The Irish were unable to capitalise on an excellent start, losing to England and Wales and coming fourth, whilst the Welsh managed a win against Ireland in their final game to scrape into joint third place after a terrible start.

Table

Results

References

External links
Full Results and Line-ups

1968
1968 in British sport
1967–68 in Northern Ireland association football
1967–68 in English football
1967–68 in Welsh football
1967–68 in Scottish football
UEFA Euro 1968 qualifying
England at UEFA Euro 1968
England–Scotland football rivalry